Christine Fan (born March 18, 1976), better known by her stage name FanFan or her Chinese name Fan Wei-chi, is a Taiwanese singer-songwriter, TV presenter, record producer, actress, author and philanthropist. She sings mostly in Mandarin, but has also recorded in English. A popular singer, she has 3 million followers on Facebook and over 47 million fans on the Chinese portal Sina Weibo. She speaks Mandarin fluently and has some working knowledge of English.

Early life 
Fan was born in Ohio on 18 March 1976. She is the elder of two children and has a younger brother.

Biography 
Fan was born in Ohio. She studied at Pomona College but transferred in her second year to Harvard Extension School, a distance-education branch of Harvard University. She subsequently dropped out to pursue her musical career. She hosted the variety show, Bang Bang Tang on Channel [V] in Taiwan and has also starred in various commercials. On 1 November 2008, she held her first ticketed concert in Taipei. She later held concerts in Taichung, Hong Kong, Beijing and other Chinese cities. She was also the special guest in JJ Lin's concert in Singapore.

She has composed and written lyrics for herself as well as other artists, including Claire Kuo, Angela Chang, Freya Lim, and the girl group Hey Girl.  In 2015, she and Blackie Chen founded a talent agent company and signed Kimberley Chen, and she became her mentor, talent agent and record producer while she was pregnant with twin boys.

Personal life 
In 2003, because of the pressure of her sudden change in career path suggested by her record company to let her become an actress, she suffered severe depression and mild anorexia. She eventually recovered through her religion and with support from friends. A week after receiving the diagnosis, her doctor committed suicide.

She dated basketball-player-turned-entertainer Blackie Chen for ten years before he proposed on February 17, 2010 during a National Basketball Association game between the New Jersey Nets and the Miami Heat in Izod Center. (They had courtside seats cheering for Chen's friend, Nets player Yi Jianlian. She also sang "The Star-Spangled Banner" for the Nets home game against the Memphis Grizzlies on February 21, 2010.) Both Christians, they married on May 7, 2011 in a church in Taipei. Their twin sons were born on January 15, 2015. The couple is active in charity work, most notably co-founding the Love Life campaign.

Discography 
 FanFan's World (2000)
 The Sun (2001)
 The Sound of Music (2003)
 For Fan - Original Dream (2004)
 One to One (2005)
 Our Anniversary (2006)
 Philosopher (2007)
 Faces of FanFan (2008)
 F One (2009)
 Love and FanFan (2011)
 Together (爱,在一起) (2012)
 Fanfan's time to give thanks (范范的感恩節) (2016)
 Solitary Moment'' (恰如其分的自己) (2022)

Filmography

Film

TV Dramas

Concerts

We Are Friends Concerts

Love & FanFan world tour

My Dear Life Concert

On the Road to Happiness world tour

References

External links 

 

1976 births
Living people
Harvard Extension School alumni
Singers from Ohio
Taiwanese Mandopop singers
Place of birth missing (living people)
VJs (media personalities)
21st-century American singers
21st-century Taiwanese singers
21st-century Taiwanese women singers
Taiwanese people from Hebei
American people of Chinese descent
American people of Taiwanese descent
Pomona College alumni